The murder of George Floyd, an African American, by a white police officer, Derek Chauvin, during an arrest in Minneapolis, Minnesota on May 25, 2020, sparked large-scale protests against systemic racism, both in the United States and elsewhere. As a result of the protests, numerous controversial forms of symbolism were either changed or removed.

In the United States, changes focused on removing and prohibiting displays of the Confederate battle flag; the flag of Mississippi was changed to remove a Confederate battle insignia. Around the world, numerous name changes occurred in response to the protests, while in Canada, the U.S. and New Zealand several police reforms were enacted, primarily in relation to the policing of ethnic minority communities.

Several sports teams which used mascots featuring Native Americans, both inside and outside the United States, announced plans to change them; the State of Rhode Island and Providence Plantations voted to shorten its name to the 'State of Rhode Island'. In the film and television industry, numerous casting changes occurred in relation to white voice actors for non-white characters, while several films and television shows were edited, rewritten, cancelled, or pulled from streaming services as a result of the protests.

Key:

Employment practices

Flags

Design changes

Prohibition of Confederate flag emblems

Removal of physical flags

Heraldry

Notable proposed changes:
 The coat of arms of Massachusetts, displayed in the Seal of Massachusetts and Flag of Massachusetts contains a colonist's sword held over the image of a Native American, both of which were criticized by activists. A state commission created by law to examine the issue voted in 2022 to replace the flag.

Monuments and memorials

Museums and other displays

Names

Police reforms

Products

Games

School mascots and logos

Technology

Television and streaming

Cancellations

Casting changes

Removals from streaming services

Other changes

Other changes

See also
Weinstein effect

Notes

References

Further reading 

 Turman, Katherine. (June 30, 2020). Radio Pulled Violent Songs Off Air After 9/11 — But It Won’t Reckon With Race. Rolling Stone.

Aftermath of the George Floyd protests
Lists of events
Self-censorship